Team Anglès or English Colony Team, was a football scratch team based in Barcelona, Spain, which existed only during the year 1900, playing a total of four friendly matches against the likes of FC Barcelona and Català FC. The team mainly consisted of members of the British colony living in Barcelona, hence its name. Some historians ascribe this entity as "a group of thirty friends, English workers, who played alternately and without a regular squad".

They also played a massive role in FC Barcelona's beginnings, since Team Anglès merged with them on 13 December 1899, just two weeks after Barça was founded, and some of its players were prominent figures in Barça's early success. Furthermore, the British brought their more advanced knowledge of football to the region, a sport still relatively unknown in Barcelona at the time. Despite its very short life, the football teams of the English Colony of Barcelona left a big mark in the history of Catalan football.

History
Team Anglès was formed in 1899 by members of the British colony living in Barcelona that had been playing football, among whom there were some figures who had played for the Sociedad de Foot-Ball de Barcelona of 1894–96, such as Henry W. Brown and the Parsons brothers, John and William. The latter also went on to found FC Barcelona on 29 November 1899.

Team Anglès made its debut against FC Barcelona, which was playing the very first match in its history that day, on 8 December, at the Velódromo de la Bonanova, ending in a 1–0 win in favor of the Britons, courtesy of a goal from Arthur Witty. Five days later, on 13 December, the Blaugrana team merged with Team Anglès, which meant a big leap in quality for the club, and as a result, Barcelona become one of the strongest teams in Catalonia at the turn of the century. Some of the British players that joined Barça were prominent figures in Barça's early success, such as the Wittys, the Parsons and the Morris brothers, and Stanley Harris, who went on to be the first Barça player to get a red card. This merge also lead to the expansion of Barça's board of directors with John Parsons becoming the vice-president of the club while his brother William was appointed as the new vice-captain of the team behind Joan Gamper, and when William left he was replaced by Ernest Witty.

On 26 December, Team Anglès faced a combination of FC Barcelona and Català FC, losing 2–1, courtesy of a brace from Gamper. Two weeks later, on 6 January 1900, the same scenario was held again, and Team Anglès achieved the revenge they were looking for with a comfortable 3–0 win. In this game, they used two players from Escocès FC, goalkeeper John Hamilton and defender Jim Dykes, who played alongside Henry W. Brown in defense, and together they kept a clean-sheet. On 9 March 1900, six players from Team Anglès reinforced Escocès FC, a team made up of Scottish workers from a factory in Sant Martí, in a match against HMS Calliope, a ship who had docked at the port of Barcelona. The game ended in a 2–3 loss, and naturally, the Scots blamed their misfortunes on their neighbors.

This entity, which like its predecessors was also never officially established, seems to disappear around 1900, and never to be reformed again.

Notable players
 John and William Parsons: Originally from the Sociedad de Foot-Ball de Barcelona of 1894–96. John played in all of the team's four matches.
 Henry Wood: Originally from the Sociedad de Foot-Ball de Barcelona of 1894–96, he was one of the main figures of this entity, where he stood out as a great defender.

Squad

Note: Hamilton and Dykes were borrowed from Escocès FC for one match.

Results

See also
Football in Catalonia

References

Defunct football clubs in Catalonia
Association football clubs established in 1899
Association football clubs disestablished in 1900
1899 establishments in Spain
1900 disestablishments in Spain
Football clubs in Barcelona